Samuel Fournier (born January 28, 1986 in Lacolle, Quebec) is a retired professional Canadian football fullback for the Montreal Alouettes of the Canadian Football League. He drafted 19th overall by the Hamilton Tiger-Cats in the 2010 CFL Draft. Fournier has also been a member of the Edmonton Eskimos. He played college football for the Laval Rouge et Or.

Samuel Fournier signed with the Tiger- Cats as a free agent on June 2, 2012. He spent the entire 2011 season on the Eskimos injured list. In 2010 Samuel was selected by the Tiger-Cats in the third round (19th overall) of the CFL Canadian Draft. He joined the Laval Rouge et Or in 2006 and was named Rookie of the Year and won the Vanier Cup in both 2006 and 2008. He played in the East-West Bowl in 2009.
Over four seasons, Fournier played in 45 of the team's 46 games. He carried the ball 97 times for 621 yards and eight touchdowns and also had 14 receptions for 141 yards. He started his football career in Saint-Jean-sur-Richelieu, Québec, joining the Les Géants du Cégep St-Jean where he broke the all-time rushing record with 1534 yards in eight games in 2004. He was his team MVP and league MVP in 2004–2005.
During those same years, he played with Team Canada Junior to represent his country at the NFL Global Junior Championships. He won the World Title twice in 2005 and 2006 and was twice named Team Canada MVP in 2004 and 2006.

References

External links
Just Sports Stats
Montreal Alouettes bio

1986 births
Living people
Canadian football fullbacks
Edmonton Elks players
Hamilton Tiger-Cats players
Montreal Alouettes players
People from Montérégie
Laval Rouge et Or football players
Players of Canadian football from Quebec